Branka Kuzeljević (born July 26, 1989 in Užice, SR Serbia, SFR Yugoslavia) is a Serbian cross-country skier.

She represented Serbia and Montenegro at the 2006 Winter Olympics in Turin, Italy. At only 16 years of age, she was the youngest member of the Serbia and Montenegro Olympic team.

References
 Olympic biography

1989 births
Living people
Serbian female cross-country skiers
Olympic cross-country skiers of Serbia and Montenegro
Cross-country skiers at the 2006 Winter Olympics
Sportspeople from Užice